Kelly Babstock (born August 4, 1992) is a Canadian-American ice hockey player who currently plays with the Metropolitan Riveters of the Premier Hockey Federation (PHF). She has Ojibwe roots and is originally from Little Current on Manitoulin Island, part of the Wiikwemkoong Unceded Territory. Babstock played collegiate ice hockey with the Quinnipiac Bobcats and, remains the top point scorer in the program’s history. In the National Women's Hockey League (NWHL; renamed PHF in 2021), she played with the Connecticut Whale from 2015–2018 and with the Buffalo Beauts during the 2018–19 season. In the Whale's inaugural game on October 15, 2015, she became the first Canadian-born player to score a goal in a NWHL regular season game.

Playing career

Before NCAA 
Babstock attended Port Credit Secondary School in Mississauga, Ontario, where she was the ice hockey leading scorer for three years and men's field lacrosse leading scorer for one year.

Babstock's junior ice hockey career was played with the Toronto Jr. Aeros of the Provincial Women's Hockey League (PWHL). She helped the team win the gold medal and League Cup during the 2009–10 season, registering 25 goals and 35 assists (60 points) during the regular season, and nine goals and four assists (13 points) during playoffs.

NCAA
Kelly Babstock was a member of the Quinnipiac Bobcats women's ice hockey team from 2010–2014. She made her mark on college hockey in her freshman season, recording 59 points in 37 games. Over four seasons with Quinnipiac, Babstock registered a total of 95 goals and 108 assists, for a total of 203 points in 148 games.

On November 12 and 13, 2010, Kelly Babstock made Quinnipiac hockey history as she accounted for six of the seven goals scored over the weekend. Babstock registered back to back hat tricks against ECAC Hockey opponents (No. 10 ranked Harvard and Dartmouth). As of November 14, Babstock led the Bobcats and the entire NCAA in goals (13) and points (27).In addition, she was the first skater in Quinnipiac history to record two hat tricks in one season.

Versus the Brown Bears on Friday, December 3, 2010, Kelly Babstock became Quinnipiac's all-time leader in goals scored in a season by netting her 16th goal of the season. Babstock's nation leading sixth game-winning goal against Yale on Saturday, Dec. 4 was part of a Bobcats 3-1 win.

With a second period goal versus the Colgate Raiders on November 19, 2011, Babstock became the Bobcats program's all-time leading scorer. In just her second season, Babstock surpassed Vicki Graham, who previously held the record with 73 career points, set after the 2006-07 season. Babstock reached the milestone in her 50th career game.

Kelly Babstock led all skaters in points at the 2011 Nutmeg Classic with four (one goal, three assists). With the two assists in the championship game, Babstock earned the 39th and 40th assists of her career, surpassing Caitlin Peters as the all-time assist leader in Bobcats history. Breann Frykas scored the game-winning goal as the Bobcats bested the Robert Morris Colonials by a 3–2 tally. In honor of her stellar performance, Babstock was named 2011 Nutmeg Classic MVP.

After four outstanding years with the Quinnipaic women's ice hockey team, Babstock joined the Quinnipiac women's lacrosse team as a senior. She played in ten games (four starts), and finished the season with 21 points (14 goals, seven assists). With this record at the end of the season, she was ranked second on the team in points and was named to the 2014 MAAC All-Rookie Team.

NWHL
Competing in the Connecticut Whale's inaugural game on October 11, 2015, Babstock scored a goal in the third period of a 4-1 win against the New York Riveters. Assisted by Kelli Stack, Babstock became the first Canadian-born player to score a goal in NWHL regular season play. Babstock was selected as a “media pick” to play in the 2017 NWHL All-Star Game. Playing for Team Steadman, Babstock scored a goal at the 2nd NWHL All-Star Game, the only Canadian to do so. She also participated in the 2018 NWHL All-Star Game.

In June 2018, Babstock signed with the Buffalo Beauts.

Babstock was affiliated with the Tri-State chapter of the Professional Women's Hockey Players Association (PWHPA) during the 2019–20 season but was not selected to participate in any of the organization's showcases or events.

On May 2, 2020, Babstock announced her return to the NWHL, signing with the Canadian expansion team, the Toronto Six, for the 2020–21 NWHL season. She joined four former PWHPA players already signed with the Six, including former Connecticut Whale teammates Shiann Darkangelo and Emma Greco. On returning to the NWHL after a year with the PWHPA, she explained, "I realized the [PWH]PA’s goals didn’t match mine and the NWHL’s matches with my goals. So I’m excited to play hockey again." On October 15, 2020, it was announced that the Six had traded her to the Metropolitan Riveters in exchange for the Riveters' first round pick in the 2021 NWHL Draft and second round pick in 2022.

She became the fourth player in NWHL history to reach 100 career penalty minutes in the opening game of the 2020–21 NWHL season, also picking two assists as the Riveters defeated the Six 2–0.

Career statistics

Regular season and playoffs

Source: Elite Prospects

Awards and honours

Collegiate 

Weekly/monthly collegiate honours and awards

 ECAC Hockey Player of the Month (2)
November 2011, October 2012
Quinnipiac University Athlete of the Month (4)
November 2010, December 2010, January 2011, November 2013
ECAC Hockey Player of the Week (10)
2010–11: December 7, February 15
2011–12: November 22, February 21
2012–13: October 9, October 16, December 4, February 12
2013–14: October 22, December 3
ECAC Hockey Rookie of the Week (5)
2010–11: October 5, November 16, November 30, December 7, February 15

Professional

Other 
 Aboriginal Role Model of the Year, 2011
 Little Native Hockey League Hall of Fame – Alumni, 2016

Personal life 
Babstock's mother, Donna, is Ojibwe from the Wiikwemkoong Unceded Territory and her father, David, is from Newfoundland. She is the third eldest of six siblings; one older and two younger sisters and two brothers. Her older brother, Jeff Shattler, plays with the Saskatchewan Rush of the National Lacrosse League and serves as Director of Player Development for the Fighting Sioux lacrosse program of Standing Buffalo Dakota Nation.

A Canadian citizen by birth, Babstock gained American dual-citizenship in 2019. She began pursuing American citizenship in her junior year of university, motivated by a desire to establish her post-collegiate life in the United States. Her Canadian-born Native American status made it relatively easy to gain a green card and she became an American citizen in a naturalization ceremony held at KeyBank Center on January 29, 2019. Of gaining American citizenship, she said, “It’s a big deal, you know? You’re Native American, and you have these rights [codified under US immigration law as a result of the Jay Treaty], and I just took advantage of them.”

References

External links
 
 
 

1992 births
Living people
American women's ice hockey forwards
Buffalo Beauts players
Canadian women's ice hockey forwards
Connecticut Whale (PHF) players
First Nations sportspeople
Ice hockey people from Ontario
Metropolitan Riveters players
Ojibwe people
Quinnipiac Bobcats women's ice hockey players
Sportspeople from Mississauga
First Nations sportswomen